ITV or iTV may refer to:

ITV
Independent Television (ITV), a British television network, consisting of:
ITV (TV network), a free-to-air national commercial television network covering the United Kingdom, the Isle of Man, and the Channel Islands
ITV1, a brand name used by ITV plc for twelve franchises of the ITV television network covering England, Southern Scotland, Wales, the Isle of Man, and the Channel Islands
ITV Digital, a defunct UK digital terrestrial television broadcaster, which opened in 1998 as ONdigital and closed in 2002
ITV plc, the British parent company which owns thirteen of the fifteen ITV television network franchises
ITV Studios, a television production company owned by ITV plc
itv.com, the main website of ITV plc
ITV Parapentes, a defunct French aircraft manufacturer
ITV Independent Television Tanzania, a Tanzanian television station and member of the Commonwealth Broadcasting Association (CBA)
CITV-DT, a television station in Edmonton, Alberta, Canada
Internacia Televido, the first Esperanto-language television station, internet-based, defunct from 2006
Information Television Network, an American television production company based in Florida

iTV
iTV (Thailand), a Thai television station, renamed in 2007 as TITV, now defunct and replaced by Thai Public Broadcasting Service
iTV, a Vietnamese interactive music channel, owned by Vietnam Multimedia Corporation
iTV, the pre-release codename for the Apple TV Home media product
i-Television, a television station in Ehime Prefecture, Japan
Interactive television (iTV), television which allows the exchange of information between the sender and the receiver
i: Independent Television, now called Ion Television, an American free-to-air television network
İctimai Television, an Azerbaijani public independent television station, based in Baku

Other
Inspección Técnica de Vehículos, the Spanish motor vehicle inspection
Instructional television, the use of television programmes in distance education
Internet television (Internet TV or iTV), television distributed via the internet (instead of being 'broadcast' via radio waves)
M901 ITV ('Improved TOW Vehicle'), an armored, mobile missile launcher of the U.S. Army
ITV, Interference by television, Television interference